Abe Jones (birthdate unknown)  was an American baseball catcher and manager in the pre-Negro leagues.

Along with Frank Leland and W.S. Peters, Jones played for and managed the Chicago Union Giants for the first two years of the club, then moved to the catcher position until 1894.

References

Chicago Unions players
Negro league baseball managers
Year of birth missing
Year of death missing